I'm a Boss is a 2009 Chinese television comedy-drama directed by Zheng Xiaolong, starring Jiang Wu as an idiosyncratic and Quixotic mid-aged Ma Yiming who, forced to leave his government career, enters the business world as an entrepreneur. Ma Yiming is a likeable character who is selfless, dependable, diligent, upstanding, and full of righteousness, but who is also utterly unsuccessful; his frequently amusing misfortunes highlight the contrast between the ideal that the Communist-Party propagates and the capitalistic reality in contemporary Chinese society.

Broadcast
The show was first broadcast in May 2009 on Beijing Television. In Taiwan, it was shown on Videoland Max-TV in March 2010.

Cast and characters
Jiang Wu as Ma Yiming, the protagonist
Zhang Heng as Shi Hong, a nurse and Ma Yiming's wife
Wang Lei as Shi Jun, Shi Hong's jobless brother, though he claims he owns a million-dollar company
Wang Jingsong as Ma Yiping, a taxicab driver and Ma Yiming's brother
Wang Yajie as Li Qinqin, a landlady
Niu Piao as Feng Zhiyuan, a businessman
Xu Zheng as Xu Tianlai, a businessman
Li Jingjing as Bai Lihua, a businesswoman
Fu Miao as Chen Xi, a gold-digging secretary
Li Xiaomeng as Ranran, a young bartender
Liu Yiwei as a businessman
Fang Zige as Ma Yiming's superior

Awards and nominations
Xu Zheng was nominated for Best Supporting Actor at the 4th Huading Awards.

References

2009 Chinese television series debuts
2009 Chinese television series endings
Mandarin-language television shows
Television shows filmed in Beijing
Chinese comedy-drama television series
Television shows filmed in Tianjin